The Ethiopian movement is a religious movement that began in southern Africa towards the end of the 19th and early 20th century, when two groups broke away from the Anglican and Methodist churches. One of the main reasons for breaking away was the growing idea that Africa had little to no history before the European colonisation of the continent, leaving many Africans upset at the prospect of their heritage and culture being erased through colonialism.

Later in the 19th century, many Africans who found themselves in America due to slavery found solace in a passage of the bible speaking of Ethiopia which connected them to their lands and gave them hope of blacks being able to one day self govern. Their interpretations of the Biblical passage (Psalm 68:31): "Ethiopia shall soon stretch forth its hands unto God" (in the original Hebrew, actually כּוש Cush) united them to one another and also to their homes and cultures.

The term was later given a much wider interpretation by Bengt Sundkler, whose book Bantu Prophets in South Africa was the first comprehensive study of African Independent Churches (AICs).

History 
In 1888, an evangelist, Joseph Mathunye Kanyane Napo, seceded from the Anglican Church to form the Africa Church or African Church, which was composed  of Anglicans who were dissatisfied with race-based control of the Anglican Church. Kanyane Napo's Church was established in Marabastad, Pretoria and was the first intertribal church formed and led by Africans in South Africa. Napo created the African Church to prove that there could be an entirely African church built without the help of the missionary, and kept the liturgical style of worship and doctrines found in Anglican churches.

In 1892, former first head of African ministers in Pretoria , Mangena Maake Mokone, decided to form a new branch and formed the Ethiopian Church, in South Africa, mainly because of dissatisfaction with racial segregation in the church and the lack of fellowship between black and white ministers. His preachings included the theme of "Africa for the Africans", which was later a pillar of the UNIA-ACL.

A group of former Anglican and Methodist leaders gathered around Mokone, including Kanyane Napo, Samuel James Brander, James Mata Dwane and several others. Two relatives of Mokone, Kate and Charlotte Maneye were studying at Wilberforce University in America, and Kate wrote to Mokone to tell him about the African Methodist Episcopal Church, which her sister Charlotte had joined. This led the Ethiopian Church to decide to join the African Methodist Episcopal Church (AME Church) in 1896, and Rev. Mokone, James Mata Dwane, and J G Xaba went to the US to negotiate the union. They ended up signing the negotiation and successfully merged the two churches, this allowed South Africans of the parish to go to America to study.

Over time Dwane, who had previously worked to build the Ethiopian Church, found issues with the relations between the church and their new partners, the African Methodist Episcopal Church. He disliked the paternal presence of the AME Church and began to found his own following known as the Order of Ethiopia. He led followers of the Ethiopian Church away into the new denomination with his teachings which would ally with the Anglican Church of the Province. Dwane is said to have done this due to his desire to become a bishop within this church, however he never did, and many of his original followers left when they realized they would be allying with the Anglican Church of the Province, a "white church". The Order of Ethiopia soon became composed predominantly of Xhosan people, and had little variety of followers unlike the Ethiopian Church from which they separated.

Charlotte Maneye married the Revd Marshall Maxeke, and they did missionary work for the AME Church in South Africa, and in 1908 they founded the Wilberforce Institute in the Transvaal, modelled on her American alma mater.

Many of the original Ethiopianist leaders, however, became dissatisfied with the AME Church, and found Black American domination of the church leadership as irksome as White British domination.1.They felt that there was little difference between the black American domination and that of missionary churches where African churchgoers had little to no say in the congregation, which was the entire reason for forming new branches of churches in the first place. In 1904 Samuel James Brander formed the Ethiopian Catholic Church in Zion, which combined the Anglican and Methodist strands of the Ethiopian tradition. It initially included Kanyane Napo and Daniel William Alexander among its leaders, but both of them appear to have later broken away to revive Napo's African Church. During the period 1900–1920 many different Ethiopian denominations were formed, which were heirs of the Ethiopian tradition.

Ethiopianism 
Ethiopianism was not really an ideology, a theological school, or a political program. It was rather a cluster of ideas and traditions about being Christian in Africa that were shared by a group of Christian leaders in the period from 1890–1920. These ideas and traditions focused on the history of Africa before European colonization and taught Afro-Atlantic teachings, meaning they brought together the religious ideas of both the Europeans and the Africans. There was no sharp boundary to the movement, but it shaded off into other groups.

Features of the Ethiopian movement included:

 the use of the name Ethiopia, Ethiopian, Cush or Cushite in the names of churches
 the aim of a united African Christianity, based on the idea that "Ethiopia shall stretch out its hands to God"
 Anglican-Methodist ecclesiastical polity and theology
 In spite of many schisms, the Ethiopianist leaders formed a network, and interacted with each other more than they did with leaders of other traditions

Wider meaning of Ethiopian

The description above is of the Ethiopian movement itself, but writers like Bengt Sundkler used Ethiopian in a wider sense to include all African independent church denominations that had broken away from Western-initiated Protestant groups like the Presbyterians, Congregationalists and Baptists, as well as the Anglicans and Methodists.

Sundkler therefore classified bodies like the African Congregational Church and Zulu Congregational Church as "Ethiopian", though they did not really participate in the Ethiopian movement itself. The independent churches of the Congregational tradition formed a separate network from the Ethiopian one, with less contact between the networks.

See also 
Marcus Garvey
UNIA-ACL
Order of Ethiopia
African Initiated Churches
Ethiopia
South Africa
Alexander Bedward
 Ethiopian Renaissance

Notes 
 Ethiopianist refers to those who adhered to the ideas of Ethiopianism, to distinguish them from those who live in Ethiopia, or who belong to the Ethiopian Orthodox Tewahedo Church.

 Ethiopianism is considered by scholars to be the origin of the Rastafari movement, and William David Spencer (author of Dread Jesus) suggests that its theological goal, popularized by Marcus Garvey, was that God is black.

Bibliography

Further reading 
 Morrison, Doreen. Slavery's Heroes: George Liele and the Ethiopian Baptists of Jamaica 1783–1865. CreateSpace.

External links 
 African Initiated Churches–

Anglicanism in South Africa
History of Christianity in Africa
African initiated churches
Wilberforce University